Red Eye Radio is a talk radio program currently hosted by Eric Harley and Gary McNamara. The program is syndicated nationwide by Westwood One, and originates from WBAP in the Dallas-Fort Worth metroplex. The show traces its history through several predecessors, beginning with Bill Mack's overnight truck show in 1969.

History

Bill Mack
Bill Mack was the founder of WBAP's overnight program, the U.S. 1 Trucking Show. Mack started the show in 1969. The show, as the name implied, was geared toward the American truck driver and featured a lot of country music. The show briefly attempted an excursion into Mexico on border blaster XERF, but that arrangement ended after it was clear that Mack would not be able to host the show from his home in Fort Worth.

Eventually, the show's name changed to the Midnight Cowboy Trucking Show and the Midnight Cowboy Radio Network and was syndicated by ABC Radio, who carefully selected the affiliates to give maximum coverage of the country.

Mack left the show in September 2001 to join the Open Road channel on XM Satellite Radio.

Midnight Trucking (ABC)
After Mack's departure in 2001, ABC changed the name of the show to Midnight Trucking Radio Network. The network tapped WBAP producer Eric Harley, along with Joe Kelley, to host the show. In addition to Mack's old network, MTRN absorbed Dave Nemo's old The Road Gang network when Nemo left for XM as well.

Midnight Radio Network (Jones/Dial Global)
ABC turned over syndication of the program to Jones Radio Networks in 2005, and Kelley left the show. Jones turned to Gary McNamara, a conservative talk radio host, to fill Kelley's seat. With the change in focus from solely truckers to a more general purpose program, the show changed its name yet again, to the Midnight Radio Network. Under Jones, the number of affiliates grew from about a dozen stations, mostly 50,000-watt clear-channel "flamethrowers," to 38.  Seven clear-channel stations - WBAP, WJR in Detroit; KXL in Portland, Oregon; KXEL in Waterloo, Iowa; WLS in Chicago; KBOI in Boise; and KOKC in Oklahoma City, as well as regional station WMAL in Washington, D.C. - front the network, which claims to reach all 48 contiguous states plus Hawaii.

The show now also broadcasts on XM Satellite Radio (channel 171) after a long run on Sirius Satellite Radio (Road Dog Trucking) ended in 2007. With the change, the Midnight Radio Network joined former host Bill Mack along with Dale Sommers and Dave Nemo on the channel.

By 2007, many references to "Midnight Trucking" had returned to the show, and by early 2009, to celebrate the show's 40th anniversary, it reverted to the "Midnight Trucking" name.

In April 2008, parent syndicator Jones Radio Networks was sold to Triton Media Group, which integrated Jones into Triton's Dial Global network. Some changes were made in the months following. One of the first was the removal of the show from satellite radio, as Open Road merged with Road Dog Trucking.

Red Eye Radio (Cumulus/Westwood One)
The name Red Eye Radio came from Cumulus Media Networks' existing overnight talk show, which at the time of Cumulus's acquisition of Citadel Broadcasting was hosted by Doug McIntyre (who originated the name and had previously used it on a local Los Angeles-based show prior to changing time slots) on weeknights and Marc Germain on weekends. Upon Cumulus' acquisition of Citadel (and, by extension, WBAP and the rest of the former ABC Radio assets), Cumulus also reassumed syndication of Harley and McNamara, reassigned McIntyre to a local show in Los Angeles, and rebranded Harley's and McNamara's show under the Red Eye Radio name. As a result of the reorganization, the show also gained several major market affiliates, including New York City and Los Angeles, where Red Eye Radio had established itself, and refocused the program as a competitor to Premiere Networks's ubiquitous Coast to Coast AM, eventually moving towards a generic conservative talk direction, though trucking news and content remains a major part of the show.

On December 21, 2012, just before the first anniversary of the Harley-McNamara version of the show, the hosts announced on air that they had signed a new multi-year contract to host the show.

Format
The show runs five hours each night, from midnight to 5 am Central Time. Harley and McNamara primarily address political issues, most commonly promoting libertarian and conservative viewpoints. The show is available seven days a week, but usually a "best of" program airs on weekends.

References

External links
 

1969 radio programme debuts
American talk radio programs
American country music radio programs
Conservative talk radio
Libertarianism in the United States
Radio programs on XM Satellite Radio
Westwood One